Bear Brook is a small stream in the municipalities of Clarence-Rockland and The Nation, United Counties of Prescott and Russell, and the city of Ottawa in eastern Ontario, Canada. It forms in the fields and forests just north of Edwards, and flows in a mostly eastern direction to its mouth as a left tributary of the South Nation River.

Communities along the brook include Edwards, Carlsbad Springs, Bearbrook, Cheney, and Bourget.

History

In the mid 19th century, the Bear Brook was used by loggers for floating timber to sawmills, a few of which operated in Carlsbad Springs from 1854 to 1905. It was also used by settlers for transportation to their homesteads. However the brook was too small and dry in the summer, and its use for transportation was quickly discontinued upon completion of Russell Road. All the surrounding mature forests have been logged, and consequently the brook drains faster.

See also
List of rivers of Ontario

References

External links 
 
 Cumberland Township Historical Society

Rivers of Ottawa